Pallam Anfal (born 4 September 1990) is an Indian first-class cricketer who plays for Kerala. He made his first-class debut for Kerala in the 2012–13 Ranji Trophy on 15 December 2016.

References

External links
 

1990 births
Living people
Indian cricketers
Kerala cricketers